Olearia magniflora, commonly known as splendid daisy-bush, is a small shrub with clusters of deep mauve to purple flowers.

Description
The branches are smooth and more or less woody. The sessile leaves are dark green above and paler underneath, smooth, slightly sticky and sparsely arranged alternately along the stem. The flower centre is a yellow disk of 30-56 florets. The seed is dispersed at maturity. Flowers from July to January.

Taxonomy and naming
The splendid daisy-bush was first described in 1865 by Ferdinand von Mueller who called it Aster magniflora and published the description in Fragmenta phytographiae Australiae. In 1867 George Bentham changed the name to Olearia magniflora and published the change in Flora Australiensis. The specific epithet (magniflora) means "large-flowered".

Distribution and habitat
The splendid daisy-bush grows in New South Wales, Victoria, Western Australia and South Australia. In New South Wales it is found mainly growing from Balranald and Wentworth areas and north to Wilcannia.  It grows in heath, woodland and mallee in well-drained, sandy loam soils.

References

Flora of New South Wales
Flora of South Australia
Flora of Western Australia
magniflora
Flora of Victoria (Australia)
Plants described in 1865
Taxa named by Ferdinand von Mueller